"The Black Queen" is the tenth and final episode of the first season of the HBO fantasy drama television series House of the Dragon. Written by Ryan Condal and directed by Greg Yaitanes, it first aired on October 23, 2022. Two days before it aired, the episode leaked online and was shared among many fans on illegal torrent websites.

The plot depicts Princess Rhaenys' arrival at Dragonstone from King's Landing to deliver the news of  King Viserys' death. Rhaenyra is subsequently crowned Queen of the Seven Kingdoms and opposes her faction's demands for open war, instead wanting to secure alliances. Her son, Lucerys, is sent to Storm's End to gain Baratheon support for Rhaenyra's cause. At Storm's End, Lucerys meets and is harassed by his uncle Aemond; Aemond loses control of his dragon Vhagar, who kills Lucerys. Daemon informs Rhaenyra of her son's death. 

The episode received critical acclaim, with praise going towards the writing, musical score, cliffhanger and set-up for the next season, the whole sequence in Storm's End, and performances of the cast, especially Emma D'Arcy and Matt Smith.

Plot
Princess Rhaenys arrives on Dragonstone to inform Rhaenyra and Prince Daemon that King Viserys is dead and that Aegon has usurped the throne. The news shocks Rhaenyra into a difficult premature labour and stillborn birth. During labour, she declares Prince Jacaerys Velaryon as her heir to the Iron Throne, and he is to be known as Jacaerys Targaryen. Believing King Viserys was murdered, Daemon urges Rhaenyra to declare war against the Greens. Ser Erryk Cargyll brings Viserys' crown to Rhaenyra and Daemon proclaims her Queen of the Seven Kingdoms. All present but Rhaenys bend the knee.

Delivering the conditions of Aegon's peace along with a unique keepsake from Dowager Queen Alicent is Ser Otto Hightower. If Rhaenyra gives up, she will keep Dragonstone for herself and her children. Her younger son, Prince Lucerys, would be confirmed as heir to Driftmark. Rhaenyra and Daemon's sons would receive high positions within Aegon's court; Rhaenyra’s supporters would be pardoned. Daemon refuses Aegon's offer, but Rhaenyra, now the Black Queen, considers abdicating to peacefully unite the realm against the threat foretold by Aegon the Conqueror's dream. When Rhaenyra cites Aegon's dream, the Song of Ice and Fire, Daemon angrily objects and grabs Rhaenyra's throat, choking her. Shaken, she realises that King Viserys never revealed Aegon's dream to Daemon.

Rhaenys persuades her husband, Lord Corlys Velaryon, to support Rhaenyra's "Black" faction and protect their familial ties to the throne. Corlys, who now controls the Stepstones and Narrow Sea, proposes blockading King's Landing's shipping lanes. Prince Jacaerys volunteers himself and younger brother, Prince Lucerys, to recruit Houses Arryn, Stark, and Baratheon to the Blacks. Daemon notes that the Blacks have more dragons but they need more dragonriders. He enters a large cave and awakens a hibernating dragon.

Jaecerys flies to the Eyrie and Winterfell while Lucerys travels to Storm's End on his dragon Arrax to meet with Lord Borros Baratheon. He discovers Prince Aemond is there with his dragon Vhagar. Lucerys relays Rhaenyra's message, reminding Borros that his father swore an oath to support her succession. Borros reveals that Aegon has offered a political alliance by Aemond marrying one of his daughters. Borros refuses Rhaenyra's appeal, saying she has offered him nothing in return and that Lucerys, already betrothed, cannot also marry a Baratheon daughter.

Lucerys rejects Aemond's demand to gouge out his own eye as retribution for slashing Aemond's years earlier. Borros allows Lucerys to safely leave on Arrax. In a severe storm, Aemond follows on Vhagar, verbally taunting and mock-charging Lucerys and Arrax. The much smaller Arrax attacks and burns Vhagar, inciting the massive dragon and causing it to disobey Aemond's commands. Aemond is horrified when Vhagar kills both Lucerys and Arrax. When Daemon informs Rhaenyra of Lucerys’s death, she is visibly distraught and enraged.

Production

Writing 
"The Black Queen" was written by showrunner and executive producer Ryan Condal, marking his fourth writing credit for the series, following "The Heirs of the Dragon", "The Rogue Prince", and "Second of His Name".

Filming 
The episode was directed by Greg Yaitanes, making it his third time as director for the series after "The Rogue Prince" and "Second of His Name".

Casting 
The episode stars Matt Smith, Emma D'Arcy, Rhys Ifans, Steve Toussaint, Eve Best, Harry Collett, Ewan Mitchell, Bethany Antonia, and Phoebe Campbell. Following the death of Prince Lucerys Velaryon, the episode marks the final appearance of Elliot Grihault.

Reception

Ratings 
"The Black Queen" was watched by a total of 9.3 million viewers, which included linear viewers during its premiere night on October 23, 2022, both on HBO and HBO Max, making it the network's most-watched season finale since the series finale of its predecessor Game of Thrones. While on HBO alone, it was watched by an estimated 1.85 million viewers during its first broadcast. This rose to 2.72 million viewers after a week.

Critical response

The episode was met with acclaim from critics. On the review aggregator Rotten Tomatoes, it holds an approval rating of 93% based on 40 reviews, with an average rating of 8.3/10. The website's critical consensus said, "Culminating in a spectacular and tragic dance of dragons amidst a storm, 'The Black Queen' is a visually splendid capper to House of the Dragon's inaugural season." 

It received a rating of 5 out of 5 stars from Tom Percival of The Digital Fix, 4.5 out of 5 stars from Alec Bojalad of Den of Geek, Molly Edwards of GamesRadar+ and Oliver Vandervoort of Game Rant, and 4 out of 5 stars from Ed Power of The Telegraph and Hillary Kelly of Vulture. Percival said that it was "a wonderfully compelling cliffhanger to leave the first season on" and an "excellent conclusion" to the season. Edwards wrote in her verdict: "The season finale is another rock-solid episode, with dragons, disaster, and excellent performances from the cast." In his review, Power stated, "with its series finale, House of the Dragon has emphatically seized the crown [...] and effortlessly taken up on the baton from Game of Thrones. As the curtain came down on its debut season, it was confirmed that it has the potential to soar as high as Thrones at its finest." Reviewing for IGN, Helen O'Hara gave it an "amazing" score of 9 out of 10 and wrote in her verdict, "It's been a sometimes slow-burning first season to House of the Dragon, but the emotional impact of this finale shows that all that ground-laying has established characters to care about and invest in. It also kicks off the Dance of the Dragons in earnest with the best action scene of the season." Erik Kain of Forbes called it "a tremendous and powerful season finale" and that it "surpassed every expectation". Cameron Frew of Dexerto deemed it "breathtaking television" and considered the overall series "the best TV show of 2022".

Critics praised the performances of its cast, particularly D'Arcy, Grihault, Mitchell, and Smith, with the former being singled out as the highlight of the episode. The New York Times's Jeremy Egner found their performance "brilliant", TV Fanatic's Paul Dailly regarded it as "one of the most striking performances in franchise history", while CBRs Lissete Lanuza Sáenz called it Emmy-worthy. TVLine named D'Arcy the "Performer of the Week" for their performance in the episode, for the week of October 29, 2022. The site specifically singled out three scenes, namely Rhaenyra's giving birth scene, the discussion in the Chamber of the Painted Table, and the final scene of Rhaenyra reacting to her son's death. For the latter scene, the site wrote, "D'Arcy filled their character with an aura of vengeful resolve. That face when they turned toward the camera at the end of the episode? Like so much of D'Arcy’s showing in the season-ender: Chills." Particular scenes that were singled out by critics were Rhaenyra's coronation as queen, the whole sequence in Storm's End, especially Aemond chasing after Lucerys amid a rainstorm, and the final scene. Several critics praised the change in Aemond's characterization from the source material, for which he did not intend to kill Lucerys. Bojalad pointed out the decision as a way to humanize Aemond, who was a far more violent and sadistic character in the book. Other aspects of the episode that were highlighted by critics included Yaitanes' direction, Djawadi's musical score, and the set-up for season two.

IGN included the episode in its "Best TV Episodes of 2022" list.

References

External links
 "The Black Queen" at HBO
 

House of the Dragon episodes
2022 American television episodes